List of islands of Slovenia

Sea Islands 
Nameless island in Lucija part of the marina

Ex-islands 
Koper
Izola

Lake islands 
 Bled island
 an underground island in Cross Cave

River islands 
 Kostanjevica na Krki
 Maribor Island
 Otočec

List of islands

References 

Slovenia
 
Islands